The 2015 St. Petersburg Open was a tennis tournament played on indoor hard courts. It was the 20th edition of the St. Petersburg Open, and part of the ATP World Tour 250 Series of the 2015 ATP World Tour. It took place at the Sibur Arena in Saint Petersburg, Russia, from September 21 through 27, 2015.

Singles main-draw entrants

Seeds

 1 Rankings are as of September 14, 2015

Other entrants
The following players received wildcards into the singles main draw:
  Evgeny Donskoy
  Andrey Rublev
  Mikhail Youzhny

The following players received entry from the qualifying draw:
  Radu Albot
  Andrey Golubev
  Yaraslav Shyla
  Alexandre Sidorenko

Withdrawals
Before the tournament
  Pablo Andújar →replaced by Ernests Gulbis

Doubles main-draw entrants

Seeds

 Rankings are as of September 14, 2015

Other entrants
The following pairs received wildcards into the doubles main draw:
  Evgeny Donskoy /  Konstantin Kravchuk
  Andrey Rublev /  Mikhail Youzhny

Finals

Singles

 Milos Raonic defeated  João Sousa, 6–3, 3–6, 6–3

Doubles

 Treat Huey /  Henri Kontinen defeated  Julian Knowle /  Alexander Peya, 7–5, 6–3

External links
Official website

St. Petersburg Open
St Petersburg Open
St Petersburg Open
September 2015 sports events in Russia